Dmitriyevka is a rural locality in Verkhnekhotemlsky Selsoviet Rural Settlement, Fatezhsky District, Kursk Oblast, Russia. Population:

Geography 
The village is located on the Verkhny Khoteml Brook (a link tributary of the Usozha in the basin of the Svapa), 101 km from the Russia–Ukraine border, 38.5 km north-west of Kursk, 7 km south-west of the district center – the town Fatezh, 2 km from the selsoviet center – Verkhny Khoteml.

 Climate
Dmitriyevka has a warm-summer humid continental climate (Dfb in the Köppen climate classification).

Transport 
Dmitriyevka is located 2.5 km from the federal route  Crimea Highway as part of the European route E105, 29 km from the road of regional importance  (Kursk – Ponyri), 3.5 km from the road  (Fatezh – 38K-018), 1.5 km from the road of intermunicipal significance  (M2 "Crimea Highway" – Verkhny Khoteml), 33.5 km from the nearest railway station Vozy (railway line Oryol – Kursk).

The rural locality is situated 41 km from Kursk Vostochny Airport, 160 km from Belgorod International Airport and 232 km from Voronezh Peter the Great Airport.

References

Notes

Sources

Rural localities in Fatezhsky District